Hong Ru (閎孺) was the favorite companion of the Chinese Emperor Hui of Han.  
Hong Ru's dress and cosmetics were imitated by other courtiers in an attempt to impress the emperor. These noblemen began wearing feathers in their hats, powdering their faces, and dangling sea shells from their clothes. Hong Yu was documented by China's Grand Historian Sima Qian.

Sources
Homosexuality and Civilization by Louis Crompton

Ancient LGBT people
Male lovers of royalty
2nd-century BC Chinese people